Kinross High School is a state school in Kinross, Scotland.

The school is located adjacent to the leisure centre, and is part of Loch Leven Community Campus, named after the nearby Loch Leven. In 2007, it was announced that the school would be moving to a new campus, as part of a scheme of school building in the Perth & Kinross area. The move was completed in 2010. The school has about 1012 pupils enrolled and about 100 members of staff. It is now a Community Campus with public facilities including a climbing wall, a gym, a library and several meeting rooms.

Roll
 2010/2011 - 915 pupils
 2011/2012 - 895 pupils
 2012/2013 - 906 pupils

Catchment area
The school serves most of the local communities around Kinross shire. Schools that are in the catchment area are:
 Kinross Primary School
 Milnathort Primary School
 Portmoak Primary School
 Fossoway Primary School
 Cleish Primary School
 Blairingone Primary School
 Arngask Primary School (as of 2013)

Facilities
The High School is located in Loch Leven Community Campus which helps try to bring the community together. As a result, many of the services that used to be offered in Kinross have now been moved into the campus. The library is now located near the main entrance. This allows the public to borrow books but also allows pupils to borrow books for their classes. It also provides an area for the pupils to study on their study periods and other classes to use the IT facilities. There are also various meeting rooms throughout the campus which are available to hire. There is also a new climbing wall used for extra curricular clubs after school. There are now three main PE halls and a gym. The three halls include a large games hall, a smaller games hall and a dance studio. Each hall has the facility to play music through the speakers and the games hall has a large scoreboard if rival teams are playing against each other.

There are also new outdoor pitches. The MUGA (Multi Use Games Area) is used to play sports like basketball, tennis and hockey. There is also a football pitch and a larger pitch used for games, running and rugby.

Notable alumni

 Eilidh Doyle, athlete
 Laura Muir, runner

References

External links

 Kinross High School's page on Scottish Schools Online
 Kinross High School website

Secondary schools in Perth and Kinross
Kinross